"Teardrops on My Guitar" is a song by American singer-songwriter Taylor Swift, taken from her self-titled debut album (2006). Swift wrote the song with Liz Rose, and Nathan Chapman produced it. Big Machine Records released "Teardrops on My Guitar" to US country radio on February 20, 2007, as the album's second US single. The song was released to US pop radio as a crossover single in November 2007. It was included on the international edition of Swift's second studio album, Fearless, and released in the UK in 2009.

Swift wrote the lyrics inspired by her unrequited love for a high school classmate. Musically, the track is a gentle acoustic guitar-driven ballad and incorporates mandolin and fiddle. Music critics have conflicting opinions about the song's country-music classification, with those disagreeing pointing out the pop music production. Critics reacted positively to the track, complimenting Swift's vocal delivery and songwriting style. "Teardrops on My Guitar" peaked at number 13 on the Billboard Hot 100, and was Swift's first pop radio crossover single on the Mainstream Top 40 chart. The single was certified triple platinum by the Recording Industry Association of America (RIAA).

The song's music video was directed by Trey Fanjoy and features Swift as she sees her love interest develop a relationship with another female. The video received a nomination for MTV Video Music Award for Best New Artist, but lost to Tokio Hotel's music video for "Ready, Set, Go!". Swift performed the song live while supporting as the opening act for other country-music artists' concert tours, and included it on the set list of her first headlining tour, the Fearless Tour (2009–10).

Background and release
Swift was inspired to write "Teardrops on My Guitar" about her experience with a boy named Drew Hardwick, a classmate of hers whom she had feelings for. Hardwick later went on to join the United States Navy, and was also arrested for aggravated child abuse in 2015. During their freshman year at Hendersonville High School in Hendersonville, Tennessee, Swift and Hardwick sat beside each other in class every day. The two became friends, although Swift secretly desired for them to become a couple. Because of Hardwick's unawareness, he would frequently speak to Swift about another girl he had feelings for, something Swift pretended to be endeared by, commenting, "How beautiful she was, how nice and smart and perfect she was. And I sat there and listened, never meaning it any of the times I said 'Oh, I'm so happy for you.'" Hardwick and his crush eventually developed a relationship which lasted for a few years. Swift never confessed her feelings to him. By the release of Taylor Swift, he remained unaware of Swift's intentions or of the song and continued his relationship with the same female. Upon "Teardrops on My Guitar"'s release as a single, Hardwick attempted to contact Swift via phone calls, which Swift did not respond to; he then left voicemails, but Swift felt too awkward to call back.

Two years after the album's release, as she was leaving her house to attend a Nashville Predators hockey game with Kellie Pickler and Carrie Underwood, Hardwick appeared at her driveway. A car parked and, out of it, exited Hardwick and a friend of his. After two and a half years of not speaking, the two conversed: "He was like, 'Hey, how's it going?' And I'm like, 'Wow, you're late. Good to see you.' But we were civilized." Swift conjectured multiple theories as to why Hardwick appeared at her house. One of them was that he was attempting to prove to his friend that he was indeed the subject of "Teardrops on My Guitar". Other possibilities was that he wanted to rebuild their friendship or believed Swift was still pining away from him. Swift said it would have been poetic if he approached her upon the album's release and she would have accepted, but that she had already moved on. Swift cited "Teardrops on My Guitar" as an example of how she expresses her sentiments in songs and sometimes in no other manner. She was not afraid of using Hardwick's first name on the track and, therefore, believed it was very honest and susceptible, something she adored.

"Teardrops on My Guitar" was released to US country radio on February 20, 2007, by Big Machine Records as the second single from Swift's debut album. Big Machine and Republic Records released the song to US contemporary hit radio in November 2007. The track was included on the non-US editions of Swift's second album, Fearless, released in March 2009. In the United Kingdom, "Teardrops on My Guitar" was released as a single on May 18, 2009, by Mercury Records.

Composition

"Teardrops on My Guitar" is a country pop song with a length of three minutes and 35 seconds. It is set in common time and has a moderate tempo of 104 beats per minute. Critics have conflicting opinions about the song's country-music classification. NPR categorized it as a pop song, and Ed Masley from The Arizona Republic described it as a soft rock song, and commented the country-music elements are the steel guitar and twang in Swift's vocals. Grady Smith from Rolling Stone deemed it one of Swift's "countriest" songs. Musicologist James E. Perone found "Teardrops on My Guitar" full of "pop hooks" and described it as a musically flexible track because it can be adapted into many styles of pop, country, and rock. It is written in the key of B major and Swift's vocals span one octave, from F3 to B4. Swift sings in a breathless manner. It follows the chord progression B–Gm–E–F. The track's instrumentation is gently guided by mandolin and acoustic guitar, with accents of brushed drums. It ultimately results in a simple and tender undertone. The version released to pop radio replaces the banjo with a drum loop.

The lyrics of "Teardrops on My Guitar" speak of heartbreak and are direct, referring to the subject by his first name, Drew. The song describes fancying someone who is already interested in someone else and, therefore, maintaining the sentiments a secret. To him, Swift acted as though she was happy about his relationship, while crying and lamenting at home. Dave Heaton of PopMatters interpreted the lines "And there she goes, so perfectly / The kind of flawless I wish I could be" to address Swift's ideal of perfection and her attempting to meet it, but not succeeding, a predominant theme on Fearless.

Critical reception

"Teardrops on My Guitar" has received acclaim from contemporary critics. Perone cited the song as Swift's songwriting ability to draw on diverse musical styles and regarded the "teardrops on my guitar" image one of the album's most memorable lyrical detail. Regarding the song's musical genre, Roger Holland of PopMatters believed there was no reason for Swift to limit herself into only the country music or why she should be a country artist at all. Holland continued, "Yet this is the channel to market she has chosen, and so she has to be prepared to hear complaints about the way that trademarked Mutt Lange guitar whine has been married to her bright shiny pop songs in order to get them onto CMT, GAC, and country radio." Bill Lamb of About.com rated "Teardrops on My Guitar" four out of five stars. Lamb complimented Swift's vocal delivery and songwriting style, but criticized the production and arrangement, perceiving them to be dull. He added that the track's refrains were most impacting and deemed it among the most memorable songs of 2007. Sean Dooley, also of About.com, described Swift's vocals as "nothing less than captivating."

Fiona Chua of MTV Asia said "Teardrops on My Guitar" demonstrated that with Swift, "what you hear is what you get", and selected it as one best cuts on Fearless. Deborah Evans Price of Billboard stated that "Teardrops on My Guitar" showcased the same qualities as "Tim McGraw" (2006) – solid gifts of songwriting and time-halting earnest and pure voice. Price declared that the song made obvious that Swift would have much success for years to come at the time. She believed the track was ultimately relatable and Swift was capable of making the song palpable. Chuck Taylor, also of Billboard, reviewed the pop version release of "Teardrops on My Guitar", and stated it was a "beautiful mainstream intro to an artist whose rise is ably exemplified by her last name." An uncredited review from Rolling Stone attributed the track to be one of the reasons why Taylor Swift was so commercially successful. Jon Bream of Star Tribune believed the song was in attempt to empower high school- and college-age females by confronting males. In 2019, Insider named "Teardrops on My Guitar" one of the fourteen best songs written by teenagers. It also ranked at number 47 on Teen Vogue "91 Best Songs About Unrequited Love" list, while Swift's 2009 single "You Belong with Me" topped the list.

Commercial performance
In the United States, "Teardrops on My Guitar" peaked at number 13 on the Billboard Hot 100 chart dated February 23, 2008. It peaked at number two and spent 27 weeks in total on the Hot Country Songs chart, which tracks US country radio. Swift's breakthrough chart success in the United States, it made its crossover appearance to pop radio, peaking at number seven and spending 21 weeks on the Mainstream Top 40 chart. It was Swift's first single to enter the pop charts. The song peaked within the top 10 of four airplay charts—Hot Country Songs, Mainstream Top 40, Adult Pop Songs, and Adult Contemporary. The single was certified triple platinum by the Recording Industry Association of America (RIAA) in April 2014, for surpassing three million units based on sales and streaming. By July 2019, "Teardrops on My Guitar" had sold three million digital copies in the United States.

In Canada, "Teardrops on My Guitar" peaked at number 45 on the Canadian Hot 100 chart dated August 12, 2007. The single was certified platinum by Music Canada (MC) in July 2011, for sales of 80,000 digital downloads. In the United Kingdom, after its release in May 2009, the single peaked at number 51 on the UK Singles Chart. In August 2021, it was certified silver by the British Phonographic Industry (BPI) for 200,000 units based on sales and streaming.

Music video

Trey Fanjoy directed the music video for "Teardrops on My Guitar". Swift worked again with Fanjoy, who had directed the video for Swift's debut single "Tim McGraw", because of positive experiences, "You have to remember the people who were good to you in the beginning". For "Teardrops on My Guitar", Swift said the theme was unrequited love. Despite recommendation from label personnel that the video should have been set in a prior era and filmed at a larger city, Swift kept it simple and filmed it in Nashville. American singer and actor Tyler Hilton portrayed the male lead. Swift had been fond of Hilton's music as well as acting on the television series One Tree Hill and the film Walk the Line (2005). She chose Hilton particularly because she thought he resembled the subject behind the song, Drew Hardwick, whom she had a crush on during high school. Swift invited other high-school friends, her cousin, and her brother Austin to portray fellow high-school students in the halls.

In the video, Swift and Hilton portray two high school students. Swift's character is in love with Hilton's, but he is in love with another girl. Scenes of the two characters studying together are intertwined with scenes of Swift's character in a long aquamarine evening gown, lying beside an acoustic guitar on a mattress in a bedroom. By the song's bridge, Swift's character witnesses the male lead kissing his girlfriend as she watches despondently. The video ends with Swift in the bedroom, crying on the mattress. The video received a nomination for "Number One Streamed Music Video" at the web-hosted 2007 CMT Online Awards, but lost to Sugarland's "Stay" (2007). The video received a nomination for MTV Video Music Award for Best New Artist at the 2008 MTV Video Music Awards, but lost to Tokio Hotel's video for "Ready, Set, Go!" (2007).

Accolades

Live performances

She performed "Teardrops on My Guitar" as she opened for Rascal Flatts on several dates, from October 19 to November 3, 2006, included on the Me and My Gang Tour (2006–07). Swift opened the concert with the song and dressed in a black, knee-length dress and red cowboy boots with a design of a skull and crossbones across it, playing an acoustic guitar. She also performed the song when she served as opening act on twenty dates for George Strait's 2007 United States tour, and selected dates for Brad Paisley's Bonfires & Amplifiers Tour in 2007. Throughout mid-2007, Swift engaged as the opening act on several dates for Tim McGraw's and Faith Hill's joint tour, Soul2Soul II Tour (2006–07), where she again performed "Teardrops on My Guitar". During that period, she also performed the song at a set for Longwood University's Spring Weekend. Swift performed the song while she was again opening for Rascal Flatts for their Still Feels Good Tour in 2008.

When promoting the single, Swift performed it on numerous venues, including Total Request Live (TRL),
The Engine Room, on the Studio 330 Sessions, and a concert at the Apple Store in SoHo, New York, which was recorded and released as a live extended play (EP), iTunes Live from SoHo, exclusively sold through the iTunes Store. In the United Kingdom, the song was performed at an exclusive performance, hosted by 95.8 Capital FM and on The Paul O'Grady Show. Since completing promotion for Taylor Swift and its corresponding singles, Swift has performed "Teardrops on My Guitar" as a duet with English rock band Def Leppard on CMT Crossroads, the episode was released as a DVD exclusively through Wal-Mart stores in the United States, Clear Channel Communications's Stripped, at the 2009 CMA Music Festival, at the 2009 V Festival, and at the Australian charity concert Sydney Sound Relief.

Swift performed the song on all venues of her first headlining concert tour, the Fearless Tour, which extended from April 2009 to June 2010. During each performance, she donned a sparkly cocktail dress and black, leather boots. The performance initiated with Swift sitting in a desk, next to a backup dancer who portrayed Swift's love interest, at the upper level of the stage, which a library was projected onto. The backup dancers then stood up to slow dance with a female backup dancer as Swift sang from above. Swift then appeared at the main stage to conclude the performance. Jim Abbot of The Orlando Sentinel attended the March 5, 2010, concert at the Amway Arena in Orlando, Florida. He stated, "Taking a cue from her pal Miley Cyrus, Swift embellishes hits such as 'Teardrops On My Guitar' and 'Love Story' with a lot of flashy production in concert." Brandy McDonnell of The Oklahoman, who attended the March 31, 2010, concert at the Ford Center in Oklahoma City, believed "Teardrops on My Guitar"'s music video heavily influenced the setting and role she enacted in the performance. Swift performed the song for the first time in three years during The Red Tour's stop in San Antonio on May 22, 2013. Swift performed the song for the first time in 5 years, at the Denver stop on her Reputation Stadium Tour on May 25, 2018.

Credits and personnel
Credits are adapted from the liner notes of Taylor Swift (2006).

 Taylor Swift – vocals, songwriter, guitar, harmony vocals
 Liz Rose – songwriter
 Nathan Chapman – producer, banjo, bass, acoustic guitar, electric guitar, harmony vocals
 Eric Darken – percussion
 Dan Dugmore – steel guitar
 Rob Hajacos – fiddle
 John Willis – acoustic guitar (high string)

Charts

Weekly charts

Year-end charts

Certifications

Release history

Notes

References

Sources

 

2000s ballads
2007 singles
Country ballads
Pop ballads
Music videos directed by Trey Fanjoy
Songs written by Liz Rose
Songs written by Taylor Swift
Taylor Swift songs
Song recordings produced by Nathan Chapman (record producer)
Big Machine Records singles
Songs about heartache
Torch songs
2006 songs
American soft rock songs
Rock ballads
Country pop songs